Rao Bahadur Rudragouda Aratal was a Deputy Collector of Belgaum in the British Government. He is also a founder of KLE Society which was established in 1916. One of the revenue administrative report mentions Aratal in this way The entire credit of eradicating corruption from the Revenue department, goes to Rao Bahaddur R.C.Aratal

Literary works
 The Village Goddess Dyamavva 
 Basawis(Rain) in Peninsular India 
 Life and work in Indigenous Schools

Recognition
Late Indian scholar M M Kalburgi has authored a book named Aratal Rudragoudara Charitre on the life story of Rudragouda Aratal. The book has been published by Prasaranga division of Karnatak Lingayat Education Society, Belgaum

Death
He died on 4 October 1932 in Belagavi.

References

Karnataka Lingayat Education Society
1851 births
Year of death missing